Jebena (Amharic: ጀበና, Arabic: جبنة) is a traditional Ethiopian and Eritrean flask made of pottery and used to brew coffee. Locally known as jabana, it is also widely used in Sudan, and the coffee itself is called bunna.

Overview

The jebena is most commonly used in the traditional coffee ceremony, where women serve coffee to their guests in small clay pots or ceramic pots, alongside an assortment of small snacks such as popcorn, peanuts and the traditional ambasha.

It is usually made of clay and has a neck and pouring spout, and a handle where the neck connects with the base. The jebenas used in Ethiopia commonly have a spout, whereas those utilized in Eritrea usually do not. It is of a medium size, with a neck, a spout and a handle, as well as some regional variants possessing straw lids, and an extra spout to pour the coffee out of, as well as different shaped bases.

The jebena, containing ground, roasted coffee beans and water, is laid directly upon hot coals to bring the water to a brewing temperature. Typically, when the coffee boils up through the jebena's neck, it is poured in and out of another container to cool it. The liquid is then poured back into the jebena until it bubbles up. To pour the coffee from the jebena, a filter made from horsehair or other material is placed in the spout of the jebena to prevent the grounds from escaping. The advantage of the earthenware flask over metal and glass coffee-pots is that it keeps the liquid hot for a longer period of time.

In Ethiopia, a small pottery cup called a sini or finjal is used to contain the coffee poured from the jebena.

In Ethiopia they use a slightly different variation, theirs having a separate spout lower on the pot for pouring out the coffee. In Eritrea the jebena has only one spout at the top, used both for filling with water and grinds and for pouring out the coffee.

It is considered a staple household object in Ethiopia, with decorations and designs being used to represent social status. It has a close association to the bunna, and the rich history of coffee in Ethiopia.

There is a small restaurant in Addis Ababa, Ethiopia, made in an image of an Ethiopian jebena figure.

History 
According to local mythology, the most commonly held belief on the origin of the coffee bean was that it was first discovered by a goat farmer in Ethiopia after noticing the effect it had on his goats after consuming the beans. Coffee has since been brewed and served alongside the jebena in Ethiopia since approximately 1100 AD. The origin of the jebena and its use in the bunna is unclear and there are conflicting myths and legends on the initial origin of the jebena in the bunna.

The bunna and jebena are endemic in the Horn of Africa region, with different regions having different rituals surrounding both, specifically Eritrea and Ethiopia.

The jebena holds a significant place in Ethiopian and Eritrean culture. Families will usually have only one, and it is normally passed down from generation to generation as a practical, ornate heirloom. The jebena can be described as an 'artifact', as opposed to a tool, as it represents significant shared cultural experience and status in Ethiopian and Eritrean culture.

Prevalence

Ethiopia 
Brewing coffee is tied closely to womanhood in Ethiopia and in the Horn of Africa. When brewing coffee with the jebena, the youngest woman of the family is always the one to initiate the process. Brewing coffee in the jebena is also a distinctly social event, where during the time it takes to prepare the beans and brew the coffee, families will socialise.

The ornate nature of a jebena makes it a coveted item for a family, with potters in Ethiopia often not having access to tools such as pottery wheels. As a result, a highly decorated jebena is a sign of wealth and status amongst families in Ethiopia and Eritrea.

In Ethiopian culture, whenever coffee (Amharic: buna) is made in the jebena, it is a time for women to socialise and gather away from men. This has created a close association between woman-hood and coffee making. Women are expected to take great pride in their coffee ceremony and in taking care of their jebena, and great social expectation is placed upon the apparatus used in the ritual.

Because of the ritualistic nature of the buna ceremony, if a jebena is not used to prepare and boil the coffee, by all accounts, a bunna ceremony is not taking place. It is considered rude for a guest to have any less than three cups of coffee from the jebena when a bunna ceremony is taking place and it is considered good luck for a participant to consume all three cups of coffee of bunna.

A household would traditionally participate in the bunna ceremony three times a day, preparing a pot of coffee in the jebena each time. On each occasion, the woman preparing the bunna will announce to all persons in the household that it is taking place, and will invite people to enjoy the ritual before beginning to roast the beans and starting the process of making coffee in the jebena.

Migrants of Ethiopia 
Ethiopians displaced around the world by the military coups during the 70's and 80's still participate in making coffee in the jebena for the bunna frequently, despite no longer being in Ethiopia. It is suggested the jebena, despite not necessarily being an item that is worth a large sum of money, is of great sentimental value, as it represents a tangible connection they possess with their home nation. Ethiopian Families in western nations such as the United Kingdom and the United States will continue to make coffee in the jebena for bunna', using western tools such as stainless steel pans to roast the beans, and mechanised bean grinders, because of this connection it brings with their home nation.

The jebena is also tied closely to womanhood amongst migrant families. The jebena represents a delineated routine of the Ethiopian coffee ceremony, and despite families not being in their home nation, the ritual of the bunna ceremony is negated by the absence of a jebena. Because of this, the long time it takes to brew coffee in the jebena allows migrant families time to connect and furthers the collective identity women and families have built with their home nation.

In her book The Comforts of Coffee: The Role of the Coffee Ceremony in Ethiopians' Efforts to Cope with Social Upheaval during the Derg Regime (1974-1991),  D. Daniel writes of the jebena:Arguably the most important feature of the ceremony is the jebena, the coffee pot. The jebena is made from clay and has a round bottom with a narrow spout and a handle on the side. Its shape and design are reflective of the ethnic identity of the host, whether it has a large bottom or an additional spout to pour out the coffee. While certain elements of the coffee ceremony can be tweaked, modernized or all together left out, the jebena has remained the center piece throughout Ethiopia and abroad.

 Appearance 
The jebena has a long, neck-like spout, and a handle to pour with. The base of the jebena is normally large and circular, with a flat bottom so that it can balance on the surfaces without falling over. The top of the jebena is usually curved so that pouring in water and coffee grounds is easier. The neck of the spout in the jebena is intentionally very narrow, acting as a strainer so no grounds come out when pouring the coffee, so that the coffee requires less straining through a sieve.

It is normally placed on a small decorative cloth throne or on hay to stop its base, which has usually just been exposed to flames, from burning anything. There is also normally a plug at the top, made of cloth, straw or clay, to stop any water from spilling out. More modern jebena's may be made of porcelain or metal, resembling a more traditional western coffee pot. This is because it is normal to refill the jebena and brew more coffee multiple times in one coffee ceremony, so a large pot is not required.

The appearance of the jebena differs slightly, depending on the regions of Ethiopia and East Africa. Most commonly, it will be made of locally sourced clay by an elderly female. Villages often specialise in making specific types of jebenas, as well as the cup used in the bunna, known as the 'sini'. After being formed into the desired shape, designs and patterns are drawn into the still wet clay. Once dry, it is normally painted black or brown. Ornate decorations, such as gold or silver plating, and decorative painting are also common where the jebena is used as status or social symbol in Ethiopian society. These styles of decorations are usually reserved for the upper class and royalty. Other decorations consist of painting the outside with different, bright, colours or traditional dot paintings.

Regional variations also exist, with different main styles, the Ethiopian and the Eritrean:

 The Ethiopian variant has a separate spout to pour the water into and a spout to pour the coffee out from. In some areas where butter is added to the coffee, jebenas may have two spouts. 
 Eritrean variants of the jebena are made in a similar fashion, but only possess one spout for water to be poured in from, and for coffee to be poured out from.

The clay cups used to serve coffee are normally made of the same clay, and are decorated/presented in a similar manner to the jebena, and are known as 'sini'. They are normally placed on a metal tray, and this metal tray is used to serve the coffee to participants in the bunna.

 Usage 
Coffee is brewed in a jebena three times a day, in the morning, at noon and in the evening. When coffee is being prepared, it is normally time for men and women to mingle and converse separately. The matriarch or the youngest woman of a household is traditionally the person who initiates the bunna ceremony and begins the process of preparing the coffee beans to be brewed in the jebena. Coffee beans are washed, roasted and then ground by women, and often mixed with spices before the coffee begins to be brewed.

After the beans have been roasted and ground, which can take up to forty five minutes, the coffee is brewed in the jebena and served in three separate stages. While the beans are being roasted in preparation to be put in the jebena, popcorn or other small snacks are passed around. Of the three stages, the first is known as the awel, the second, the kale'i and the third, the baraka. The first of these stages, the coffee is strong and potent, with each preceding serving having slightly more dilute coffee. In total all three stages usually take two hours.

The water in the jebena, along with the coffee grounds, is then boiled on a medium-sized fire made with hot coals on a fire pit on the ground. When the coffee is finished brewing, it is poured into small clay or porcelain cups through a sieve to catch the fine coffee ground, and served with the small snacks that were consumed while the coffee was prepared. Small cups are used so that three small servings of coffee can be drunk, allowing participants to consume all three separate stages of brewing.

While the coffee is being prepared in the jebena, a woman will often light incense to create a more relaxing atmosphere in the home, and to further complete the ritual of the bunna'' ceremony. Usually, no sugar, butter or milk is added to the coffee while it is brewing or once it has been served out of the jebena, and the coffee is served to persons sitting on the ground, with the host preparing a tray of cups to deliver to individuals.

Westernised versions of this ceremony continue through the same steps, but instead use European tools to complete steps, such as roasting the beans on a stovetop, heating the jebena on a gas stove and serving in porcelain coffee cups, instead of the traditional sini.

See also

 List of cooking vessels

References

Ethiopian cuisine
Eritrean cuisine
Pottery shapes
Cooking vessels
Serving vessels
African pottery